Francisco Jesús Crespo García (born 29 July 1996), commonly known as Pejiño, is a Spanish professional footballer who plays as a left winger for UD Las Palmas.

Club career

Cádiz
Born in Barbate, Cádiz, Andalusia, Pejiño was a Cádiz CF youth graduate. On 16 July 2015, he was loaned to Tercera División side UD Los Barrios, and made his senior debut on 23 August of that year by coming on as a substitute in a 0–0 home draw against AD Ceuta FC.

Pejiño scored his first two senior goals on 4 November 2015 in a 4–3 home win against CD Utrera. The following January, he terminated his loan and moved to fellow fourth division side Conil CF, also in a temporary deal.

Pejiño returned to Cádiz during the 2016–17 campaign, and was assigned to the reserves in the regional leagues. On 18 September 2016, he scored a hat-trick in a 7–0 Primera Andaluza home rout of CD Pinzón.

Sevilla
On 26 July 2017, free agent Pejiño signed for Sevilla FC and was assigned to the C team, also in the fourth division. The following 4 February he made his professional debut with the B-side, replacing Giorgi Aburjania in a 0–1 home loss against SD Huesca in the Segunda División.

On 26 June 2018, Pejiño renewed his contract with the Nervionenses until 2022, being definitely promoted to the reserve squad now in the Segunda División B. He made his first-team debut exactly one month later, replacing Pablo Sarabia in a 4–0 UEFA Europa League home win over Újpest FC.

Pejiño featured sparingly in the main squad under Pablo Machín, but went on to appear exclusively for the B-side after the manager's dismissal. On 23 June 2020, he terminated his contract with the club.

Las Palmas
On 27 August 2020, Pejiño signed a two-year deal with UD Las Palmas in the second division.

References

External links

1997 births
Living people
People from Barbate
Sportspeople from the Province of Cádiz
Spanish footballers
Footballers from Andalusia
Association football wingers
Segunda División players
Segunda División B players
Tercera División players
Divisiones Regionales de Fútbol players
Cádiz CF B players
UD Los Barrios footballers
Sevilla FC C players
Sevilla Atlético players
Sevilla FC players
UD Las Palmas players